Roy Norris Wood Jr. (born December 11, 1978) is an American humorist, stand-up comedian, radio personality, actor, producer, podcaster, and writer best known for his correspondent appearances on The Daily Show with Trevor Noah. A native of Manhattan, Wood was raised in Birmingham, Alabama, and Memphis, Tennessee. After graduating from Ramsay High School in 1996, Wood began his career in stand-up comedy as the opening act for Tommy Davidson. He had a position as head writer on the WBHJ radio series Buckwilde Morning Show from 2001 to 2006. Wood has been featured on NBC's reality television series Last Comic Standing in 2010 and the TBS sitcom Sullivan & Son from 2011 to 2014. He currently hosts two podcasts for Comedy Central: Roy's Job Fair and Beyond the Scenes.

Wood was honored at Entertainment Weekly'''s "12 Rising Stars of Comedy" in 2008 and the 2010 Florida A&M University Young Alumni Awards. Since 2015, Wood has served as a correspondent for The Daily Show on Comedy Central. He hosted the fourth season of Comedy Central's This Is Not Happening from 2018 to 2019. In addition to his Daily Show appearances, Wood has starred in the stand-up comedy specials Father Figure (2017), No One Loves You (2019), and Imperfect Messenger (2021). He has also been featured in television series and movies.

Early life and education
Wood was born in Manhattan, New York City, New York. His father, Roy Wood Sr., was a Birmingham, Alabama, radio broadcasting and journalism pioneer who covered the civil rights movement; the racism encountered by African-American soldiers in the Vietnam War; the Soweto uprising; and the Rhodesian Bush War, among other topics. His mother is Joyce Dugan Wood, a college administrator. His paternal three times great-grandfather, Sam Wood, was born c. 1790 in Africa. His parents separated for a time, and Wood lived with his mother in Memphis, Tennessee. When Wood was in the second grade, his parents reconciled, so the family moved to Birmingham; they lived on South Park Road in Birmingham's West End neighborhood. His half-brother is Roy L. Wood, a news anchor.(no source- cited source doesn't mention this)

Wood attended Central Park Elementary and Center Street Middle School. He graduated from Ramsay High School in 1996. In 2001, Wood received a Bachelor of Science in broadcast journalism from Florida A&M University.

Career
Before Comedy Central
While in college, Wood worked as a morning news reporter for Birmingham, Alabama, radio station WBHJ 95.7 Jamz Hot 105.7. He began focusing on a career in comedy after filling in for the station's in-house comedian, Rickey Smiley.

In 1998, when he was 19, Wood began his career as a standup. Wood recalls that he passed on his midterm tests, essentially failing the semester, in order to open for Tommy Davidson. Wood spent his last two years of college doing dishes on the weekends.

In 2001, after graduating from college, Wood returned to Birmingham and became the head writer/producer for the Buckwilde Morning Show (WBHJ 95.7 JAMZ), a position he held until 2006. He continued working in radio, providing prank calls and content to various morning shows nationally and contributing to Jamie Foxx's Foxxhole station on Sirius XM Radio. Wood released three prank call CDs: My Momma Made Me Wear This (2003), Confessions of a Bench Warmer (2005), and I'll Slap You to Sleep (2007). Wood's pranks have been featured on numerous hip-hop mix tapes.

In 2007, Wood moved to Los Angeles.

In 2010, Wood finished third in the seventh season of NBC's Last Comic Standing and began hosting his own morning show, The Roy Wood Jr Show. The show garnered top ratings and won 'Large Market Morning Show of the Year' from the Alabama Broadcasters Association for several years.

From 2011 to 2014, Wood appeared on the TBS sitcom Sullivan & Son. He had a guest starring role in the first season, but was then promoted to series regular for the second and third seasons. Sullivan & Son was canceled in 2014.

In 2013, Wood's first stand-up comedy CD, Things I Think, I Think, was released.

In 2015, he was cast by ABC to play alongside Whoopi Goldberg in the comedy pilot Delores and Jermaine; the show did not make it beyond the pilot stage.

At Comedy Central
In 2015, Wood joined The Daily Show as a correspondent. Wood moved to New York City to take the job. Wood has said that his background in standup coupled with his degree in journalism prepared him for the job. Wood said that his work doing guest roles in sports on ESPN and related companies prepared him for The Daily Show, giving him experience with acting, timing, and building characters.

His first Comedy Central stand-up special, Father Figure, premiered in 2017, with an extended uncensored album of the same name released by Comedy Central Records. In 2017, he was named the new host of Comedy Central's storytelling series This Is Not Happening. Wood's second Comedy Central special, Roy Wood Jr.: No One Loves You, premiered in 2019.

Wood has appeared as a comic on many late night talk shows, including the Late Show with David Letterman, The Late Late Show with Craig Ferguson, Chelsea Lately, The Tonight Show Starring Jimmy Fallon, The Late Show with Stephen Colbert, Late Night with Seth Meyers, and Conan. Wood has performed for the troops on numerous USO tours in the Middle East and the Pacific Islands.

In 2018, it was announced that Wood planned on shooting a TV show in Jefferson County, Alabama. The pilot, called Jefferson County Probation, started shooting in May 2019. As of March 2020, a completed pilot for the show, now called Jefferson County: Probation, was shot for Comedy Central, with the show in development. The show, created in collaboration with Aaron McGruder (The Boondocks), is about two probation officers in Jefferson County, Alabama. It is loosely inspired by a 1998 experience Wood had as a 19-year-old college student, when he was arrested for stealing $400 to $500 worth of blue jeans and was sentenced to probation.

In 2019, Wood did a series of YouTube videos centered on the Popeyes chicken sandwich craze called The Coalition (Chicken Sandwich Coalition).

In 2021, he was a guest on the PBS series Finding Your Roots, where he described how he unexpectedly got probation at 19 for using credit cards he stole while a mail sorter for the US Postal Service to buy fashion jeans, and where it was revealed that he was a distant cousin of Congressman and civil rights activist John Lewis.

Honors
 2008: Entertainment Weekly, 12 Rising Stars of Comedy
 2010: Florida A&M University, Young Alumni Awards: A 40/40 Celebration

Selected publications
 
 
 

Selected filmography
 2001: Showtime at the Apollo TV series – self
 2012–2014: Sullivan & Son TV series – Roy (33 episodes)
 2003: Star Search TV series – Comedian Semi Finalist
 2005: Premium Blend TV series – self
 2006: Bob & Tom: Standup Sitting Down TV movie – writer
 2006: Bob & Tom: Standup Sitting Down – writer
 2008: The Funny Spot TV series – writer
 2008: Def Comedy Jam TV series – writer, self (1 episode)
 2010: Last Comic Standing TV series – self (5 episodes); writer (4 episodes)
 2015–present: The Daily Show TV series – self, correspondent, various characters
 2015: Delores & Jermaine TV movie – Jerome Sr.
 2017: Impractical Jokers: After Party TV series – self (1 episode)
 2017: Let's Fix Sports TV series short – writer (1 episode: "Roy Wood Jr: Kill The Kiss Cam")
 2018–2019: This is Not Happening TV series – host (20 episodes), writer (2 episodes)
 2018: The Detour TV series – Kevin (1 episode)
 2019: Roy Wood Jr.: Snitch Cop TV movie – Snitch Cop
 2019: The Death of Dick Long – Dr. Richter
 2019: Roy Wood Jr.: The Avenging Ones TV movie – Luke Rage, writer
 2019–: Crank Yankers TV series – self
 2019–2020: The Coalition (Chicken Sandwich Coalition) TV short videos – writer, creator, voice
 2020: Better Call Saul TV series – Grant (1 episode “Something Unforgivable”)
 2020: The Last O.G. TV series – Runson (1 episode)
 2020: Space Force TV series – Liaison Bert Mellows (2 episodes)
 2020: The Opening Act – Gary
 2020: Impractical Jokers: Dinner Party TV series – self (1 episode)
 2021: Only Murders in the Building TV series – Vaughn (1 episode)
 2022: Confess, Fletch Movie - Detective Monroe
 BET's ComicView TV series – self
 SportsNation TV series – self
 TBD: Jefferson County: Probation – producer, writer

Stand-up specials

Selected discography
 2003: My Momma Made Me Wear This CD
 2005: Confessions of a Bench Warmer CD
 2007: I'll Slap You to Sleep CD
 2013: Things I Think, I Think CD

References

External links

 
 
 
 Roy Wood, Jr. at Comedy Central

1978 births
Living people
African-American male comedians
American male comedians
Last Comic Standing contestants
Male actors from Birmingham, Alabama
Florida A&M University alumni
21st-century American comedians
Comedians from Alabama
Ramsay High School alumni
21st-century African-American people
20th-century African-American people